Moluccans are the Austronesian-speaking and Papuan-speaking ethnic groups indigenous to the Maluku Islands (also called the Moluccas), Indonesia. The region was historically known as the Spice Islands, and today consists of two Indonesian provinces of Maluku and North Maluku. As such, "Moluccans" is used as a blanket term for the various ethnic and linguistic groups native to the islands.

Islam and Christianity are major religions of most Moluccans. Despite religious differences, all groups share strong cultural bonds and a sense of common identity, such as through Adat. Music is also a binding factor, playing an important role in the cultural identity, and the Moluccan capital city of Ambon was awarded the official status of City of Music by UNESCO in 2019.

A small population of Moluccans (~50.000+) live in the Netherlands. This group mainly consists of the descendants of soldiers from the KNIL, the Dutch Colonial Army, who were originally brought to the Netherlands temporarily, and would have been sent back to their own independent republic, had the Dutch government not given up control of Indonesia. They and others in the world make up the Moluccan diaspora. The remainder consists of Moluccans serving in the Dutch navy and their descendants, as well as some who came to the Netherlands from western New Guinea after it too was handed over to Indonesia. However, the vast majority of Moluccans still live in the Moluccas and the other surrounding regions such as Papua, East- and West Timor, North Sulawesi, and further west.

History

The indigenous inhabitants of the Maluku Islands are Melanesian in origin and have been aboriginal to the Maluku archipelago dating back at least 30.000 BCE. However, due to later Austronesian migration waves from around 5000 - 2000 BCE, genetic studies detail the presence of varying levels of Austronesian mitochondrial DNA in populations on different islands in Maluku. Whereas paternal genetic structure remains predominantly Melanesian in its make-up within the region. This explains a primarily maternal Austronesian influence on the Melanesian population that influenced the development of typical socio-linguistic elements and other areas within the Moluccan culture, making Malayo-Polynesian languages dominating in most of the region, with the exception of some areas where languages belonging to the West Papuan language group are still prevalent. Later added to this were several Dutch, Chinese, Portuguese, Spanish, Arabian and English influences, due to colonization, intermarriage with foreign traders during the Silk-route era and Middle Ages, and even with European soldiers during the World Wars. A small number of German descendants was added to Moluccan population, especially in Ambon, along with arrival of Protestant Missionaries since 16th century.

After the Japanese occupation of the Dutch East Indies during World War II, the Netherlands wanted to restore the old colonial situation. The indigenous Indonesians were against it. However, led by rebels and Sukarno, a struggle for independence broke out between 1945 and 1950. The reconstituted Royal Netherlands East Indies Army (KNIL) was commissioned by the Dutch government to maintain order and to disarm the rebels. Moluccan professional soldiers formed an important part of this army. The Moluccan community was thus regarded by the Dutch as allies and vice versa. The government of the Netherlands had promised the Moluccans that they would get their own free state and independence back in return for assisting the Netherlands. After international efforts could not support the Netherlands to maintain its colony, the Dutch government chose to no longer keep its promise to the Moluccans of an independent state. The Moluccans, who were seen by the Indonesians as collaborators with the Dutch, were given two options, to demobilize the military force and "temporarily" go to the Netherlands before returning to an independent Maluku, or assimilate and take on the Indonesian nationality. Most Moluccans who served in the command of KNIL would reside temporarily in the Netherlands. The Moluccans were instead discharged from military service shortly after arriving, and housed in repurposed WWII concentration camps in the Netherlands, including the former Westerbork transit camp. Where they were isolated from Dutch society and held under extremely poor living conditions for years.

The Dutch Moluccans had repeatedly drawn the attention of the Dutch government to their claim for a free Republic of South Maluku (Republik Maluku Selatan or RMS) state, which the Dutch government had promised them. However, the situation began to escalate as RMS's struggle gained notoriety in the 1970s when demonstrations and violence propelled it into the Dutch public eye. Finally, after still being ignored and denied a hearing by the government, one of the methods to gain attention on the matter was through the hijackings of 1975 Dutch train hostage crisis in De Punt, Wijster, where hostages were taken, and the members were killed.

Language
The Moluccans speak over a hundred different languages, with a majority of them belonging to the Central Malayo-Polynesian language family. An important exception is the North Moluccan islands which include the island of Halmahera and its surrounding islands, where the majority of the population speak West Papuan languages (North Halmahera branch), possibly brought through historical migration from the Bird's Head Peninsula of New Guinea. Another exception are the Malay-based creoles such as the Ambonese language (also known as Ambonese Malay), spoken mainly on Ambon and the nearby Ceram; and North Moluccan Malay used on the islands of Ternate, Tidore, Halmahera and Sula Islands in North Maluku. Moluccans living in the Netherlands mostly speak Ambonese and Buru, as well as the national and official Dutch language.

Religion

The Moluccans in the northern Moluccas (present province of North Maluku) are mainly Muslim. and the Moluccans in the central and South Moluccas (present day Maluku) are mainly Christians.

The religions that are most often espoused by Moluccans in the Netherlands are the Protestant faith and, to a lesser extent, Islam.

There are significant number of native Hindu followers in Kei Islands although the region is predominantly Catholic, despite the Maluku province's overall Christian population are Protestant.

Notable people

See also

Proto-Malay

References

Ethnic groups in the Netherlands
Ethnic groups in Indonesia